Colpoma is a genus of fungi within the Rhytismataceae family. The genus contains 14 species.

References

External links
Colpoma at Index Fungorum

Leotiomycetes genera
Taxa named by Karl Friedrich Wilhelm Wallroth